Victor Ikpeba Nosa (born 12 June 1973) is a Nigerian former professional footballer who played as a forward for both club and country. Ikpeba played 31 international matches and scored seven goals for Nigeria. He was a member of Super Eagles team to the FIFA World Cups in 1994 but played and scored the lone goal against Bulgaria in the second game of the team at the 1998 FIFA World Cup. Ikpeba helped win the 1994 African Nations Cup and the Olympic football gold medal in 1996.

Career 
Ikpeba was discovered by Belgian club RFC Liège during the 1989 FIFA U-17 World Championship, and moved to play in Belgium together with teammate Sunday Oliseh. At the age of 20 and after scoring 17 goals in 1992–93, Ikpeba was bought by Monégasque side AS Monaco, then coached by Arsène Wenger. At Monaco, he gradually became a success, albeit with a tough start. He showed outstanding form subsequent to the 1996 Olympics, scoring 13 league goals to help Monaco win the league title, and also finishing as the second-top goalscorer in the 1996–97 UEFA Cup. His performances earned him the African Footballer of the Year award in 1997. Two successful seasons followed.  While at Monaco, Ikpeba nearly signed for Italian club Reggina.  But his wife, unwilling to give up life in Monaco, locked him in their house on the day he was to sign his contract. Ikpeba played in Jean Tigana's talented Monaco side which famously put Manchester United out of the Champions League in 1998 on away goals after a 1–1 draw at Old Trafford.

Ikpeba again teamed up with Sunday Oliseh at Borussia Dortmund in 1999, for a transfer fee of £4.8m. Ikpeba scored only two goals in his first season in the Bundesliga and barely played in his second, after falling out with the coach Matthias Sammer. Looking for a move abroad, Ikpeba turned down Southampton to join Real Betis on a season-long loan. Things went further downhill for the player in Spain as he was criticised for being overweight by the coach, after making just one appearance for the club. He didn't feature for Betis again up until the last two games of the season.

Ikpeba then signed a season-long contract with Libyan outfit Al-Ittihad, but only played out half of his contract with the club, as he quit the team over financial disagreements. After leaving Libya and spending almost a year without a club, Ikpeba returned to Belgium, where he joined his former Liège coach at Charleroi. After helping the club avoid relegation, Ikpeba came very close to signing with German side SC Freiburg, but the deal fell through when it was revealed that the player had no EU passport. Ikpeba then had a short spell at Al-Sadd in Qatar, before retiring from professional football.

Style of play 
In spite of his small physique, Ikpeba was a fast, versatile, and opportunistic forward, who was capable of playing as a striker, as a second striker, or on either wing, and was known for his ability to score from any position on the pitch.

Personal life 
Ikpeba now lives in Lagos, and he co-hosts Monday Night Football on Supersport. His wife Atinuke died in May 2000 at the age of 26, after losing her battle with breast cancer.

Honours 
RFC Liège
Belgian Cup: 1989–90

Monaco
Ligue 1: 1996–97
Trophée des Champions: 1997

Al-Ittihad
Libyan Premier League: 2002–03

Nigeria
African Cup of Nations: 1994
Olympic Gold Medal: 1996

Individual
Ebony Shoe Award: 1993
African Footballer of the Year: 1997

References

External links 
 
 
 
 

1973 births
Living people
Sportspeople from Benin City
Nigerian footballers
Association football forwards
Nigeria international footballers
Africa Cup of Nations-winning players
1994 FIFA World Cup players
1992 African Cup of Nations players
1994 African Cup of Nations players
1998 FIFA World Cup players
2000 African Cup of Nations players
2002 African Cup of Nations players
Olympic footballers of Nigeria
Olympic gold medalists for Nigeria
Footballers at the 1996 Summer Olympics
African Footballer of the Year winners
ACB Lagos F.C. players
RFC Liège players
AS Monaco FC players
Borussia Dortmund players
Real Betis players
Al-Ittihad Club (Tripoli) players
R. Charleroi S.C. players
Al Sadd SC players
Bundesliga players
La Liga players
Belgian Pro League players
Ligue 1 players
Libyan Premier League players
Qatar Stars League players
Olympic medalists in football
Medalists at the 1996 Summer Olympics
Nigerian expatriate footballers
Nigerian expatriate sportspeople in France
Expatriate footballers in France
Nigerian expatriate sportspeople in Monaco
Expatriate footballers in Monaco
Nigerian expatriate sportspeople in Germany
Expatriate footballers in Germany
Nigerian expatriate sportspeople in Belgium
Expatriate footballers in Belgium
Nigerian expatriate sportspeople in Spain
Expatriate footballers in Spain
Nigerian expatriate sportspeople in Libya
Expatriate footballers in Libya
Nigerian expatriate sportspeople in Saudi Arabia
Expatriate footballers in Saudi Arabia
Nigerian expatriate sportspeople in Qatar
Expatriate footballers in Qatar